Le Chat may refer to :
 Le Chat, a comic strip by Philippe Geluck
 Le Chat (novel), Simenon 1967
 Le Chat (film), a 1971 French film
 "Le Chat" (song), a 1992 single by Pow woW
 Le Chat, a sculpture by Alberto Giacometti
 Lê Chất, Vietnamese mandarin and general.
Also: 
 Le Chat Bleu, an album by Mink DeVille
 Le Chat et la souris, a 1975 film by Claude Lelouch
 Le Chat Noir, a 19th-century cabaret in Paris